Gazprom Neftekhim Salavat (formerly Salavatnefteorgsintez) is a Russia-based company active within the petrochemical industry.

References

External links
 

Chemical companies of Russia
Non-renewable resource companies established in 1948
Petrochemical companies
Companies based in Bashkortostan
Chemical companies of the Soviet Union
Companies formerly listed on the Moscow Exchange
Gazprom subsidiaries